Kevin Shirley, also known as The Caveman, is a South African born music producer, engineer and audio mixer for many artists, such as the bands Aerosmith, The Black Crowes, Silverchair,  Journey, Iron Maiden, Rush, Joe Bonamassa, Beth Hart, Dream Theater, Jimmy Barnes, Cold Chisel, The Springbok Nude Girls, All Night Radio, Steve Louw & Big Sky, HIM, Mr. Big, and Europe.

Biography
Shirley was born in Johannesburg, South Africa. He spent his early years producing and engineering records for  South African artists including Robin Auld, Juluka, Jonathan Butler, Lesley Rae Dowling, Steve Louw and Sweatband as well as performing and recording with his own band The Council, whose singer was Brian Davidson (from Freedoms Children).

He moved to Australia in 1986 where he continued working with Australian artists, such as The Hoodoo Gurus, The Angels, Cold Chisel, Girl Monstar, Tina Arena, The Screaming Jets, Baby Animals. After producing  Silverchair's debut album Frogstomp, he moved to the United States.

In the US, he  produced work for Aerosmith, Dream Theater, Black Country Communion, Journey, The Black Crowes, Iron Maiden, Rush and Slayer. He also worked on the retrospective Led Zeppelin DVD. He has produced several albums for American blues-rock guitarist Joe Bonamassa. Shirley produced the Mr. Big album What If....

In March 2023, Jimmy Barnes announced the formation of supergroup The Barnestormers, featuring Barnes, Chris Cheney, Slim Jim Phantom, Jools Holland and Kevin Shirley. A self-titled album is set for release on 26 May 2023.

Selected discography

References

General
 
  Note: Archived [on-line] copy has limited functionality.
  Note: [on-line] version established at White Room Electronic Publishing Pty Ltd in 2007 and was expanded from the 2002 edition.

Specific

External links
 Caveman Productions
 Video Interview

1960 births
South African record producers
Australian record producers
Living people